In psychoanalysis, anticathexis, or countercathexis, is the energy used by the ego to bind the primitive impulses of the Id. Sometimes the ego follows the instructions of the superego in doing so; sometimes however it develops a double-countercathexis, so as to block feelings of guilt and anxiety deriving from the superego, as well as id impulses.

Repression and isolation

Freud saw the establishment of a permanent anticathexis as a prerequisite for successful psychological repression. He also saw countercathexis as playing a central role in isolation.

In a late work, Freud further distinguished between the external anticathexis of repression and what he called “internal anticathexis" (i.e. alteration of the ego through reaction formation).

Figure-ground
Anticathexis has also been linked to the phenomenon of figure-ground, in that it may entail the suppression of the margin or ground of a perceptual field.

See also

References

Further reading
 J. Laplanche/J.-B. Pontalis, The Language of Psychoanalysis (2012)

Psychoanalytic terminology
Freudian psychology